Hanine Y Son Cubano is a music group formed in 1999 that merges Cuban music and Arabic music.

It was in the early 1990s, when he lived in Havana, that Greek-Lebanese music novelty-wiz and avant-garde producer, composer and arranger Michel Elefteriades came up with the groundbreaking music concept that led, a few years later in 1999, to the formation of Hanine Y Son Cubano, the now seminal Arabo-Cuban music genre.

It was while he was sitting in a cafe in Havana, surrounded by Afro-Cuban sounds, that Elefteriades began singing a classic of the Arabic music, "Ya Habibi ta ala" of the Arab diva Asmahan. The idea of a fusion of Cuban and Arabic music genres came instantly to his mind.

Michel Elefteriades spent two years trying to achieve this project. He selected seven of the best Cuban musicians, he chose the legendary vocalist Marcelino Linares, who died in 2000, two days before launching the concept. He auditioned hundreds of singers before choosing Hanine Abu Chakra, young singer from Lebanon who was comfortable singing classic Arabic music and had just finished her last year at the Conservatoire. The project experienced a dazzling success. The Arabo-Cuban music was born.

The band’s fulgurating success story gave birth to a few best-selling albums, namely "Arabo-Cuban" distributed worldwide by international production company “Warner”, "10908 km", which have become referential in the realm of World Music and "The Festivals Album: Baalbeck & Beiteddine".

Discography

Arabo-Cuban (2002) includes pieces from Mohammed Abdel Wahab, Abdel Halim Hafez, Farid El Atrache, Fairouz and Asmahan rearranged in salsa, Bolero and cha-cha-cha…
Arabo-Cuban was number one in Lebanon for a year, and has met with a similar success in the Middle East and other Mediterranean countries.
La llave - “Albi W Mouftahou” 
Afro blue/Zum Zum - “Ana Wel Azab We Hawak” 
Cuando - “Emta Ha Taaraf” 
El mambo de los recuerdos - “Aala Bali” 
El huerfanito - “Ya Habibi Ta'ala” 
El gallo - “El Helwa Dih” 
La flor - “Ya Zahratan Fi Khayali” 
El dia feliz - “Kan Agmal Yom” 
Descarga Arabo-cubana
Pot Pourri 
El mambo de los recuerdos “Aala Bali” (remixed by Michel Eléftériadès)
Presentations : Hanine, Marcelino Linares, Michel Elefteriades 
Bonus : phrase "Ya se me acabo el repertorio" + rires

10908 km (distance as the crow flies from Beirut to Havana)
Baladi (salsa salsita)
Zourouni (visita me)
Lama aa tarik el ein (la fuente)
Chaghalouni (ojos del alma)
Zeh’ani (soledad)
Bhebak w menak khaifi (no llores)
Imlali (llena me la copa)
Arabo-Cuban improvisation

The Festivals Album (Baalbeck & Beiteddine Festivals)
Rosana
Huwwara
Dal'ouna
Ghzayyil
Rahou
Tutti Frutti
Lama Aa Tarik El Ein
Na'eeli Ahla Zahra
Salsa Salsita
Ya Lalah
Aala Nari
Rjeena
Pot Pourri

References

External links
http://www.elefteriades.com/hanine.htm
https://web.archive.org/web/20081022025308/http://hanine.calabashmusic.com/

Musical groups established in 1999
Lebanese musical groups
1999 establishments in Cuba